The Infrastructure Investment Facilitation Company (IIFC) is a Bangladesh government company that acts as an advisory body under the Economic Relations Division of the Ministry of Finance. Sharifa Khan is the chairperson and Md. Shahabuddin Patwary is the managing director of the company.

History
Infrastructure Investment Facilitation Company was established in 1999 under the Companies Act of 1994. The purpose of the IIFC is to encourage and support public-private partnership (3P) in Bangladesh. The company provides consultancy services to public agencies and projects regarding the development of infrastructure to encourage private investments.

In 2004, M Saifur Rahman, Minister of Finance and Planning, criticized the Infrastructure Development Company Limited and Infrastructure Investment Facilitation Center for failing to properly encourage investment. It signed an agreement with Power Grid Company of Bangladesh to lease out the fiber optic cable from Chittagong to Dhaka.

According to a 2008 study, the IIFC suffered from a lack of formal or informal power, and so was involved in less than half of the 3P projects developed in the country.

In 2010, the Infrastructure Investment Facilitation Company was hired by Bangladesh Bridge Authority to provide an estimated cost of Dhaka Elevated Expressway. The previous consultant, AECOM Australia Propriety Ltd, had provided estimate that Bangladesh Bridge Authority thought was too high.

On 29 March 2021, Abdul Baki, additional secretary in charge of World Bank Wing at the Ministry of Finance, was appointed managing director of Infrastructure Investment Facilitation Company. It supported Bangladesh Railway in creating the draft Bangladesh Railway Amendment Act.

Board of directors

References

1999 establishments in Bangladesh
Organisations based in Dhaka
Government agencies of Bangladesh
Government-owned companies of Bangladesh
Public–private partnership units